William Morgan (1815 – ) was a leading member of the Birmingham Anti-Slavery Society, whose members were very influential in abolitionist movements in Britain.

Career
Morgan was trained as a solicitor and worked in Birmingham.

He was an active member of the Birmingham Anti-Slavery Society, which campaigned for abolition of slavery in the British Empire in 1838. On the anniversary of the abolition a celebration was again held in Birmingham and it was Morgan who distributed information and invitations to the local Sunday Schools.

Morgan was a founder of the local Baptist Union and served as secretary to the Birmingham Anti-Slavery Society revived around 1835, when British slavery was made illegal (in 1838). The picture shows him at the 1840 Anti-Slavery Convention which was organised by Morgan's colleague Joseph Sturge. Morgan served as a secretary at the 1840 convention. He continued to work with Sturge during the 1850s.

He became the Town clerk in Birmingham and gave a collection of books to Birmingham Library. In 1866, the British and Foreign Anti-Slavery Society sent Morgan to Jamaica.

Family
Morgan was the third son of the Reverend Thomas Morgan. He married Henrietta Barnard, from Nailsworth in Gloucestershire, on 6 March 1841.

Works
 The Arabs of tía City or a Plea for Brotherhood with the Outcast - Address to the YMCA, Birmingham, 1853 (when he was Town Clerk of Birmingham), Hudson and Son, London

References

1815 births
1890 deaths
People from Birmingham, West Midlands
English abolitionists
Local government officers in England